Ganesh Man Singh (Nepali:गणेशमान सिंह) (November 9, 1915 – September 18, 1997) was the leader of the democratic movement of 1990 in Nepal. He is revered as the Father of Democracy and the Iron-man of Nepali politics. He joined Praja Parishad to protest against the autocratic rule of the Ranas.

Early life
Ganesh Man Singh was born on November 9, 1915, in Itum Bahal, Kathmandu. His father was Gyan Man Singh and his mother was Sanunani Shrestha Singh. His father died when he was young, so his grandfather, Ratna Man Singh (who was Badakaji in the Rana regime), raised him.

He studied in Durbar High School till class 6 when he was rusticated from the school for not respecting his fellow Rana students. He then went to Calcutta to study where he completed his matriculation from Vidyasagar College in the first division. He studied until ISc (Intermediate of Science) then returned to Nepal in 1938.

Leader of Nepali Congress

Ganesh Man Singh was one of the main leaders of the Nepali Congress Movement in 2007 B.S., which was able to overthrow the Rana Regime. In 2015 B.S., he was elected as a Member of Parliament from Kathmandu and later became a Cabinet Minister. After the coup d'état by King Mahendra, Singh became one of the main leaders advocating for democracy in Nepal. He ultimately became the Supreme leader of Nepali Congress, the title he held throughout his life.

Early political life
He entered into politics formally by joining Praja Parisad, the first political party of Nepal. in 1997 B.S. Only after three months into married life with Mangala Devi Singh, he was handed life imprisonment by Ranas for waging a revolution against their autocratic rule. He successfully escaped from the prison and continued his struggle against the Ranas with Krishna Bahadur Pradhan as his pseudonym.

Later life
After the coup of 1960, Singh was held without trial for eight years at the Sundarijal Military Detention Camp.

Recognizing his outstanding contribution in the field of Human Rights, Mr. Singh was honored by the United Nations with the “Human Rights Award” in 1993. He is the first Statesman from South Asia to receive this prestigious award.

Singh had received the “United States Peace Run Prize” in 1990 for his contribution to peace in Nepal and the world and his leadership quality. He was also decorated by the “U Thant Peace Award”.

Ganesh Man Singh Foundation
Ganesh Man Singh Foundation was established in the commemoration of Ganesh Man Singh with the presidency of his son Prakash Man Singh.

Contributions of Ganesh Man Singh
Singh made major contributions to Nepal. He was the leader of the anti-Rana Movement in 2007 B.S. as well as the leader of the Nepali Congress. He gave continuous efforts for the establishment of democracy over the autocratic rule of Ranas. He was the commander of the Mass Movement-I (2046 B.S.) Ganesh Man Singh's continued effort led to multi-party democracy's establishment in Nepal. He also showed his great renunciation by refusing the post of prime minister and instead suggesting the name of his friend Krishna Prasad Bhattaraifor the post

He died on 2nd of Ashwin 2054 B.S at Kathmandu.

References

External links

Nepal homepage 
Ganesh Man Singh Organization
Ganesh Man Singh Academy 

1915 births
1997 deaths
People from Kathmandu
Government ministers of Nepal
Nepali Congress politicians from Bagmati Province
Nepalese prisoners and detainees
Prisoners and detainees of Nepal
Vidyasagar College alumni
Nepalese democracy activists
Nepal MPs 1959–1960
Nepalese political party founders
Nepalese revolutionaries
Durbar High School alumni